Echinococcidium is a genus of parasitic alveolates in the phylum Apicomplexa.

History

This genus was described by Porchet in 1978 in specimens collected in Boulogne, France.

Taxonomy

At present only a single species in this genus is known - Echinococcidium notomasti.

Description

Echinococcidium notomasti infects the intestinal cells of the polychete worm Notomastus latericeus. The protozoa are found in large parasitophorous vacuoles in intestinal epithelium or free in lumen of the gut.

The protozoa themselves have circles of spines arranged in convergent bundles to form a pyramid. They may also have single spines on body surface. Within the cytoplasm amylopectin granules may be present.

Life cycle

Nothing is known about the life cycle of this organism. It is presumably transmitted by the orofaecal route.

References

Aconoidasida
Apicomplexa genera